The posterior talocalcaneal ligament (posterior calcaneo-astragaloid ligament) connects the lateral tubercle of the talus with the upper and medial part of the calcaneus; it is a short band, and its fibers radiate from their narrow attachment to the talus.

References 

Ligaments of the lower limb